The Ulster American Folk Park is an open-air museum just outside Omagh, in County Tyrone, Northern Ireland. With more than 30 exhibit buildings to explore, the museum tells the story of three centuries of Irish emigration. Using costumed guides and displays of traditional crafts, the museum focuses on those who left Ulster for America in the 18th, 19th and 20th centuries. The museum is part of National Museums Northern Ireland.

Within the museum there are many restored, original buildings with connections to local families. The park was developed around the Mellon House, the birthplace of Irish-American banker and lawyer Thomas Mellon, founding father of the Mellon banking dynasty. This house and its outbuildings remain in their original location. Visitors can taste samples of traditional Irish and pioneer American foods including freshly baked soda bread and pumpkin pie all made on the hearths and griddles of the exhibit buildings. The museum also includes agricultural displays and an array of farm animals.

The park is open throughout the year, excluding some public holidays.

Theme
The demonstrations that take place showcase the day-to-day tasks and skills of those who lived in the era such as blacksmithing, candle-dipping, embroidery, spinning, printing, and open hearth cooking. The museum runs a lively programme of events and exhibitions that connect to their collections. The museum has also hosted many international exhibitions in recent years including Fighting Irishmen from the Irish Arts Center in New York which showcased the influence of Irish emigrants in the sport of boxing, and Warriors of the Plains from the British Museum, which explored the Indigenous peoples of North America. Special events mark the culture of both the New World and the Old World, such as U.S. Independence Day, Halloween, Easter and of course Saint Patrick's Day. The melting pot of emigrant music is celebrated with a three-day Bluegrass Music Festival every September.

The museum's visitor centre houses a cafe and shop as well as the permanent exhibition Emigrants that introduces the story of emigration from Ireland to America, before visitors embark on their journey around the outdoor museum and along the emigrant trail. Free parking is available on site.

Sections

Research and education
The entrance section includes a restaurant, a visitors' information centre and the Centre for Migration Studies (CMS). The CMS has an attached library and offers, in conjunction with the University of Ulster and Queen's University of Belfast, postgraduate and undergraduate courses, as well as tailored and shorter courses; all of the courses concern the study of Irish migration from 1600 to the present day. The specialist research library contains some 10,000 volumes, over 50 periodicals, maps, audio-visual material, and a collection of primary source documents (the Irish Emigration Database) which is searchable on computer. The centre is open to visitors during basic office hours, and closed during public holidays.

Old World

The Old World region includes whole streets of original houses, an original printing press, a bank, an old police barracks, the old Castletown National School, and two churches. Central to this region is the boyhood home of Thomas Mellon, judge and founder of the Pittsburgh banking dynasty.

Some of the two-up, two-down houses in one of the reconstructed streets in the park were transported, in their entirety, from Sandy Row, off the Donegall Road in Belfast, and other buildings have been transported from elsewhere in the province.

New World
Linking the Old and New World sections of the park is the Ship and Dockside gallery, which includes the Brig Union, a full-size replica of an immigrant sailing ship.

The historic atmosphere continues in the New World area, which features a recreated old American street with a tinsmith display and the original interior of a Virginia general store. Beyond the street, the frontier journey begins with a stop at the 1720s Fulton stone house, painstakingly dismantled in Lancaster County, Pennsylvania, and rebuilt here. Other original frontier houses in the park include an Appalachian log house from Washington county, Pennsylvania, the 1830 West Virginia home of Richard McCallister, removed from Cabell county, and a brick plantation house built by Francis Rogan in the early 19th century near Nashville, Tennessee.

See also
 Public Record Office of Northern Ireland
 Ulster Folk and Transport Museum
 Ulster Museum
 Ulster Scots people
 National Museums Northern Ireland

Notes

External links

 Centre for Migration Studies
 Ulster American Folk Park - official site

Education in Northern Ireland
Folk museums in the United Kingdom
National Museums Northern Ireland
Culture of Northern Ireland
Omagh
Museums in County Tyrone
Open-air museums in Northern Ireland
Rural history museums in Northern Ireland
Scotch-Irish American history
Museums of human migration